Jerusalén, Spanish for Jerusalem, may refer to:
 Jerusalén, Cundinamarca, Colombia
 Jerusalén, El Salvador